Dreamscapes is a limited edition eight-CD set of rare Alphaville recordings, released in 1999. It features 124 tracks with a total playing time of around 9.5 hours. 43 of the songs had never been available before, and all of the remainder had been remixed.

The four double CDs were packaged in a large (A4-sized) box, and accompanied by a large 64-page booklet, containing lyrics, rare photographs and original short fiction. Inside the box were 4 double-CDs, the cover of each was 1/4 of the overall box art.

A promotional copy called "Visions of Dreamscapes" was released to accompany the album. A shorter version of the set titled Dreamscapes Revisited was released in 2005.

Track listing

CD - 1: Dreamscape 1ne

 "Dream Machine" – 4:44 
 "In the Mood (Demo Remix)" – 5:04 
 "Summer in Berlin (Demo 1)" – 6:57 
 "A Victory of Love (Demo Remix)" – 4:15 
 "To Germany With Love (Demo 1)" – 4:29 
 "Big in Japan (Demo Mix)" – 6:24
 "Fallen Angel (Demo Remix)" – 4:07 
 "Forever Young (Demo Remix)" – 4:44 
 "Leben Ohne Ende (Original Demo)" – 3:15 
 "Sounds Like a Melody (Demo 1)" – 4:25 
 "Lies (Demo 1)" – 3:49 
 "Romance (Demo Sketch)" – 1:16 
 "Colours (Instrumental)" – 3:25 
 "Jet Set (Demo 2)" – 4:38 
 "Traumtänzer (Demo Remix)" – 5:25 
 "Into the Dark (Demo Remix)" – 4:33

CD - 2: Dreamscape 2wo
 "Lady Bright (Demo 1)" – 0:37 
 "Afternoons in Utopia (Instrumental Remix)" – 4:29 
 "The Voyager (Demo Remix)" – 4:28 
 "Universal Daddy (Demo 1)" – 3:45 
 "Red Rose (Demo 2)" – 3:25 
 "Dance With Me (12" New Edit) – 9:42 
 "Fantastic Dream (Demo 2)" – 4:01 
 "Jerusalem (Demo Remix)" – 4:30 
 "Sensations (New Dub Edit)" – 5:46 
 "Carol Masters (Demo 1)" – 4:08 
 "Airport Sketch (Instrumental)" – 1:33 
 "Lassie Come Home (Demo 2)" – 7:25 
 "20th Century (Demo 1)" – 1:22 
 "Summer Rain (Demo 3)" – 4:11 
 "For a Million (Instrumental)" – 6:24 
 "Romeos (12" New Edit)" – 5:48

CD - 3: Dreamscape 3hree
This CD represents most of the B-sides from Alphaville's catalogue up to this point

 "Seeds (Remix)" – 3:17 
 "Elevator (Remix)" – 5:06 
 "Welcome to the Sun (Remix)" – 3:09 
 "The Other Side of U (Remix)" – 4:44 
 "Next Generation (Remix)" – 4:59 
 "20.000 Lieues Sous Les Mers (Poem Remix)" – 5:42 
 "Golden Feeling (Demo 1)" – 7:40 
 "Headlines (Demo 1)" – 3:50 
 "Big Yello Sun (Remix)" – 6:49 
 "Sister Sun (Remix)" – 5:07 
 "Fools (Faithful & True Version)" – 4:17 
 "Legend (Remix)" – 4:56 
 "Like Thunder (Flag Remix)" – 5:10 
 "Life Is King (Demo 1)" – 5:53

CD - 4: Dreamscape 4our
All of the tracks on this album were recorded live
 "Never Get Out of the Boat (Intro Piece)" – 2:18 
 "Sounds Like a Melody" – 5:15 
 "Ascension Day" – 7:05 
 "Euphoria" – 7:22 
 "Jerusalem" – 4:08 
 "New Horizons" – 5:45 
 "Victory of Love" – 4:53 
 "Beethoven" – 4:16 
 "Jet Set" – 3:49 
 "Dance With Me" – 6:02 
 "Wishful Thinking" – 4:43 
 "Big in Japan" – 7:09 
 "Forever Young" – 5:48 
 "Mercury Girl" – 4:04

CD - 5: Dreamscape 5ive

 "Underworld (Live)" – 3:25 
 "To the Underworld" – 3:40 
 "Whales" – 4:30 
 "Burning Wheels" – 3:44 
 "Highschool Confidential" – 3:04 
 "Roll Away the Stone (Lunapark Version)" – 3:48 
 "The Shape of Things to Come (Demo)" – 4:58 
 "Thunder & Lightning" – 4:21 
 "Bitch" – 3:16 
 "Days Full of Wonder" – 5:06 
 "Peace on Earth (Hybrid Version)" – 5:39 
 "Today (Dreamscapes 5ive Version)" – 4:39 
 "What Is Love? (Lunapark Version)" – 5:09 
 "Because of You" – 3:52 
 "And I Wonder (Lunapark Version)" – 4:39 
 "Heart of the Flower (Dreamscapes 5ive Version)" – 4:51 
 "The End" – 5:08

CD - 6: Dreamscape 6ix
 "If the Audience Was Listening (Demo 2)" – 3:08 
 "Waves" – 3:42 
 "Nostradamus" – 4:48 
 "Mysterion" – 11:04 
 "Change the World (Demo 1)" – 4:24 
 "Script of a Dead Poet" – 3:55 
 "Elegy" – 5:45 
 "Pandora's Lullaby (Opera Version)" – 4:24 
 "Welcome to the Sun (Retro Version)" – 6:03 
 "Beautiful Girl (Piano Piece)" – 3:07 
 "Caroline (Demo 1)" – 4:21 
 "Carry Your Flag" – 3:56 
 "Cosmopolitician (Demo 1)" – 5:35 
 "Twelve Years (Orchestral Version)" – 3:22 
 "Forever Young (Unplugged Version)" – 4:32

CD - 7: Dreamscape 7even

 "Romeos (Demo 1)" – 3:35 
 "Jet Set (Demo 1)" – 4:19 
 "Traumtänzer (Demo 1)" – 5:17 
 "Blauer Engel" – 4:39 
 "Ariana (Demo 1)" – 2:38 
 "Summer in Berlin (Demo 2 Remix)" – 4:41 
 "Ain't It Strange (Demo 1)" – 4:40 
 "(Keep the) Faith (Portobello Remix)" – 4:31 
 "Recycling (H-Babe Tape)" – 1:59 
 "That's All (Instrumental)" – 2:49 
 "Forever Young (Demo 2)" – 3:45 
 "All in a Golden Afternoon (Instrumental)" – 3:34 
 "My Brothers in China (Instrumental)" – 4:30 
 "Wake Up!" – 4:34 
 "Astral Body (Demo Remix)" – 4:30 
 "Big in Japan (FFF Time Warp)" – 10:19

CD 8: Dreamscape 8ight
 "Montego Bay (Live)" – 6:53 
 "She Fades Away (Demo 1, Titanic Version)" – 3:09 
 "Those Were the Days" – 4:45 
 "Imperial Youth (Instrumental)" – 5:41 
 "Duel" – 3:54 
 "Iron Gate (Instrumental)" – 2:19 
 "Danger in Your Paradise (Demo 1)" – 5:10 
 "Feathers & Tar (Britannia Row Remix)" – 5:30 
 "Here by Your Side" – 4:01 
 "Fools (12" Speed Remix)" – 6:37 
 "Flame (Demo 1)" – 4:33 
 "In Bubblegum" – 4:25 
 "Joyride (Instrumental)" – 3:49 
 "Monkey in the Moon (Demo 1)" – 4:24 
 "Kinetic (Instrumental)" – 4:42 
 "Tomorrow (Instrumental)" – 3:28

 An instrumental version of the song "Elegy" (from Dreamscapes 6ix) is played if the user visits http://universe.alphaville.de/start.htm, which shows images of fans from around the world with Alphaville logos, phrases, and clothing. This is the only place that this instrumental version has been released

Visions of Dreamscapes
Visions of Dreamscapes (1999) is a promotional CD containing a selection of tracks from Alphaville's eight-CD compilation Dreamscapes, created to accompany the band's Brazilian tour in late 1999.

Track listing

 "Dream Machine" - 4:44
 "She Fades Away" - 3:10
 "Lassie Come Home" - 6:30
 "Carol Masters" - 4:08
 "Airport Sketch" - 1:33
 "The Voyager" - 4:26
 "Ain't it Strange" - 4:42
 "Life is King" - 5:53
 "Big in Japan - live" - 7:14
 "Twelve Years" - 3:22
 "Elegy" - 5:48
 "Pandora's Lullaby" - 4:27
 "Welcome to the Sun" - 5:59
 "Forever Young - unplugged" - 4:29
 "Iron Gate" - 2:21

Dreamscapes Revisited
Dreamscapes Revisited is a re-release of Alphaville's 1999 limited 8-CD compilation Dreamscapes. This 93 track release omits 31 of the original's 124 tracks but includes the previously unreleased "Whales (demo 1)".

Track listing
Dreamscape 1ne

 "Dream Machine" – 4:44
 "In the Mood (Demo Remix)" – 5:04
 "Summer in Berlin (Demo 1)" – 6:55
 "A Victory of Love (Demo Remix)" – 4:15
 "To Germany With Love (Demo 1)" – 4:29
 "Big in Japan (Demo Remix)" – 6:23
 "Fallen Angel (Demo Remix)" – 4:07
 "Forever Young (Demo Remix)" – 4:44
 "Leben Ohne Ende (Original Demo)" – 3:15
 "Sounds Like a Melody (Demo 1)" – 4:25
 "Lies (Demo 1)" – 3:49
 "Romance (Demo Sketch)" - 1:14
 "Colours (Instrumental)" – 3:26
 "Jet Set (Demo 2)" – 4:38
 "Traumtänzer (Demo Remix)" – 5:25
 "Into the Dark (Demo Remix)" – 4:33

Dreamscape 2wo

 "Lady Bright (Demo 1)" - 0:36
 "Afternoons in Utopia (Instrumental Remix)" – 4:29
 "The Voyager (Demo Remix)" – 4:28
 "Universal Daddy (Demo 1)" – 3:45
 "Red Rose (Demo 2)" – 3:25
 "Dance With Me (12" New Edit)" – 9:42
 "Fantastic Dream (Demo 2)" – 4:01
 "Jerusalem (Demo Remix)" – 4:30
 "Sensations (New Dub Edit)" – 5:46
 "Carol Masters (Demo 1)" – 4:08
 "Lassie Come Home (Demo 2)" – 7:25
 "Summer Rain (Demo 3)" – 4:11
 "Romeos (12" New Edit)" – 5:48

Dreamscape 3hree

 "Seeds (Remix)" – 3:17
 "Elevator (Remix)" – 5:06
 "Welcome to the Sun (Remix)" – 3:09
 "The Other Side of U (Remix)" – 4:44
 "Next Generation (Remix)" – 4:59
 "20.000 Lieues Sous Les Mers (Poem Remix)" – 5:42
 "Golden Feeling (Demo 1)" – 7:40
 "Headlines (Demo 1)" – 3:50
 "Big Yellow Sun (Remix)" – 6:49
 "Sister Sun (Remix)" – 5:07
 "Fools (Faithful&True Version)" – 4:17
 "Legend (Remix)" – 4:56
 "Like Thunder (Flag Remix)" – 5:10
 "Life is King (Demo 1)" – 5:53

Dreamscape 4our

 "Never Get Out of the Boat (Intro Piece)" – 2:18
 "Sounds Like a Melody" – 5:15
 "Ascension Day" – 7:05
 "Euphoria" – 7:22
 "Jerusalem" – 4:08
 "New Horizons" – 5:45
 "Victory of Love" – 4:53
 "Beethoven" – 4:16
 "Jet Set" – 3:49
 "Dance With Me" – 6:02
 "Wishful Thinking" – 4:43
 "Big in Japan" – 7:09
 "Forever Young" – 5:48

Dreamscape 5ive

 "Underworld (Live)" – 3:25
 "To the Underworld" – 3:40
 "Whales (Demo 1)" – 4:12
 "Whales (Demo 2)" – 4:31
 "Burning Wheels" – 3:44
 "Thunder & Lightning" – 4:21
 "Days Full of Wonder" – 5:06
 "Peace on Earth" – 5:39

Dreamscape 6ix

 "Nostradamus" – 4:48
 "Mysterion 11:04
 "Change the World (Demo 1)" – 4:24
 "Pandora's Lullaby (Opera Version)" – 4:24
 "Welcome to the Sun (Retro Version)" – 6:03
 "Beautiful Girl (Piano Piece)" – 3:07
 "Caroline (Demo 1)" – 4:21
 "Cosmopolitician (Demo 1)" – 5:35
 "Sweet Needles of Success / 12 Years (Orchestral Version)" – 3:22
 "Forever Young (Unplugged Version)" – 4:32

Dreamscape 7even

 "Blauer Engel" – 4:39
 "Ain't it Strange (Demo 1)" – 4:40
 "(Keep the) Faith (Portobello Remix)" – 4:31
 "Forever Young (Demo 2)" – 3:45
 "All in a Golden Afternoon (Instrumental)" – 3:34
 "My Brothers in China (Instrumental)" – 4:30
 "Wake Up!" – 4:34
 "Astral Body (Demo Remix)" – 4:30

Dreamscape 8ight

 "Big in Japan (FFF Time Warp)" – 10:19
 "She Fades Away (Demo 1, Titanic Version)" – 3:09
 "Those Were the Days" – 4:45
 "Imperial Youth (Instrumental)" – 5:41
 "Danger in Your Paradise (Demo 1)" – 5:10
 "Feathers & Tar (Britannia Row Remix)" – 5:30
 "Here by Your Side" – 4:01
 "Flame (Demo 1)" – 4:33
 "In Bubblegum" – 4:25
 "Monkey in the Moon (Demo 1)" – 4:24
 "Kinetic (Instrumental)" – 4:42
 "Tomorrow (Instrumental)" – 3:28

Note: The following tracks from Dreamscapes do not appear on Dreamscapes Revisited:

 "Romance (Demo Sketch)" – 1:16
 "Lady Bright (Demo 1) 0:37
 "Airport Sketch (Instrumental)" – 1:33
 "20th Century (Demo 1)" – 1:22
 "For a Million (Instrumental)" – 6:24
 "Mercury Girl" – 4:04
 "Highschool Confidential" – 3:04
 "Roll Away the Stone" – 3:48
 "The Shape of Things to Come" – 4:58
 "Today" – 4:39
 "What is Love" – 5:09
 "Because of You" – 3:52
 "And I Wonder" – 4:39
 "Heart of the Flower" – 4:51
 "The End" – 5:08
 "If the Audience Was Listening (Demo 2)" – 3:08
 "Waves" – 3:42
 "Script of a Dead Poet" – 3:55
 "Elegy" – 5:45
 "Carry Your Flag" – 3:56
 "Romeos (Demo 1)" – 3:35
 "Jet Set (Demo 1)" – 4:19
 "Traumtänzer (Demo 1)" – 5:17
 "Ariana (Demo 1)" – 2:38
 "Summer in Berlin (Demo 2 Remix)" – 4:41
 "Recycling (H-Babe Tape)" – 1:59
 "That's All (Instrumental)" – 2:49
 "Duel" – 3:54
 "Iron Gate (Instrumental)" – 2:19
 "Fools (12" Speed Remix)" – 6:37
 "Joyride (Instrumental)" – 3:49

References

Alphaville (band) albums
1999 compilation albums